Conrad Friedrich Hurlebusch (baptised 30 December 1691 – 17 December 1765) was a German/Dutch composer and organist.

Life
Hurlebusch was born in Braunschweig, Germany. He received his first education from his father Heinrich Lorenz Hurlebusch, an organist and composer. As a keyboard virtuoso, during his life, he devoted much time to tours through Europe and he visited, among others, Vienna, Munich, and Italy. From 1723 to 1725, he was a Kapellmeister in Stockholm. He held the same position in Bayreuth, Hamburg (from 1727), and Braunschweig. Reportedly, around 1735, he visited Johann Sebastian Bach in Leipzig. Bach promoted his compositions as the local bookseller of these works. Later, on 22 February 1743, he became organist at the Oude Kerk (Old Church) in Amsterdam and he retained this post until his death.

Works
His output consists of cantatas, operas (L’innocenza difesa, Flavio Cuniberto), psalms, odes, concertos and keyboard sonatas. However, many of his works were lost. His 150 psalms were published in Amsterdam in 1766.  Sammlung verschiedener und auserlesener Oden (1737-1743) by Johann Friedrich Gräfe contains 72 of his odes.

External links

Biography 

Musicians from Braunschweig
People from Brunswick-Lüneburg
German classical organists
German male organists
Dutch male classical composers
Dutch classical composers
German classical composers
German male classical composers
Dutch classical organists
German Baroque composers
1691 births
1765 deaths
18th-century keyboardists
18th-century classical composers
18th-century German composers
18th-century German male musicians
Male classical organists